Dimitri Constantine Baramki, often styled D. C. Baramki (1909, Jerusalem, Sanjak of Jerusalem – 1984, California, U.S.), was a Palestinian archaeologist who served as chief archaeologist at the Department of Antiquities of the Government of Mandatory Palestine from 1938 to 1948. From 1952 until his retirement, he was the curator of the Archaeological Museum at the American University of Beirut, Lebanon, where he served as a professor of archaeology.

Biography
Dimitri Baramki was born in Jerusalem, then in the Ottoman Empire's Mutasarrifate of Jerusalem, to a Palestinian Christian family. He studied at St. George's School, Jerusalem. He was appointed Student Inspector, Special Grade, in the Department of Antiquities of the British Mandate government from September 1927. At the beginning of 1929 he was promoted to Inspector. In 1934, he completed his academic studies at the University of London. From 1938 to 1948 he served as chief antiquities inspector in place of Robert Hamilton, who was appointed director of the department. In 1945 he was appointed Senior Archaeological officer.

During his years in Palestine, Baramki published many articles, mainly in the Quarterly of the Department of Antiquities in Palestine (QDAP) journal, on various sites - from the Bronze Age tombs to Byzantine churches.

In 1937, Baramki was the first person to identify the in situ Ayyubid text in the village mosque of Farkha, dating to  606/1210.

From 1934 to 1948 he conducted excavations and investigations at Hisham's Palace in Jericho. Baramki found the graffiti that mentions Hisham ibn Abd al-Malik and accordingly dated the construction of the palace (a statement that was later rejected) to the years of his rule (724-743), contemporary to Qasr al-Hayr al-Gharbi in Syria.

Baramki's doctoral thesis, submitted in 1953 to the University of London, dealt with Umayyad architecture and relied on the findings of his excavations at Hisham's Palace.

As part of his work in the Jericho area, Baramki discovered the Shalom Al Yisrael Synagogue in 1936.

At the end of the British Mandate in May 1948, Dimitri Baramki led Jerusalem's Rockefeller Museum for a short time.

Spoke about his appointment as head of the Department of Antiquities of the West Bank on behalf of the Jordanian government, but he found his place at the American School of Oriental Studies in Jerusalem as a consultant and librarian. In 1950 and 1951 he continued his excavations in the Jericho area on the mission of the American James Leon Kelso.

In 1952, Baramki was invited to serve as curator of the Archaeological Museum at the American University of Beirut, Lebanon, where he taught until his retirement in 1975.

Works
 The Road to Petra : A Short Guide to East Jordan (Amman, 1947)
 "Arab culture and architecture of the Umayyad Period : a comparative study with special reference to the results of the excavations of Hisham's palace" (PhD dissertation, 1953. unpublished)
 Phoenicia and the Phoenicians (Beirut, 1961)
 The Archaeological Museum of the American University of Beirut (Beirut, 1967)
 The Coins Exhibited in the Archaeological Museum of the American University of Beirut (Beirut, 1968)
 The Art and Architecture of Ancient Palestine: A Survey of the Archaeology of Palestine from the Earliest Times to the Ottoman Conquest (Beirut, PLO Research Center, 1969)
 The Coin Collection of the American University of Beirut Museum'' (Beirut, 1974)

Articles

References

Bibliography

 Helga Seeden, "Baramki, Dimitri Constantine". The Oxford Encyclopedia of Archaeology in the Near East, Vol. 1, 2009
 Dimitri C. Baramki 1909-1984, This Week In Palestine 178 , February 2013

  
 Donald Whitcomb, "Dimitri Baramki: Discovering Qasr Hisham", Jerusalem Quarterly, Institute for Palestine Studies, 2014, p. 78-82
 Donald Whitcomb and Hamdan Taha,  Khirbat al-Mafjar and Its Place in the Archaeological Heritage of Palestine, Journal of Eastern Mediterranean Archaeology & Heritage Studies, Vol. 1, No. 1 (2013), pp. 54–65; also at academia.edu

Palestinian Christians
1909 births
1984 deaths
Academic staff of the American University of Beirut
Palestinian archaeologists
People from Jerusalem
20th-century archaeologists
Palestinian emigrants to the United States